The Royal Palace of La Almudaina is one of the official residences of the Spanish royal family. Categorized as an Alcázar (fortified palace), it is located in Palma, the capital city of the Island of Mallorca, Spain.

History
This imposing alcázar, known at the time of the conquest with the name of "Zuda", was rebuilt in 1309 by the King James II of Majorca, according to the model of the Royal Palace of Perpignan. In La Almudaina, the monarchs of the Kingdom of Majorca, the Aragonese monarchs and Spanish monarchs had their court successively. Philip II of Spain destined the "Tinell" to Real Audiencia and installed in the rest of the building the General Captaincy of the Islands.

The current structure of La Almudaina corresponds to the one built in the 14th century with its different spaces; the palaces of the King and of the Queen, the chapel of Saint Anne or the baths, are the most outstanding.

Its decoration presents two environments, on the ground floor the medieval style is recreated with works from the 15th to the 20th centuries. The upper floor, used for the celebration of official acts of the Royal Family, is decorated with objects and furniture from other Royal Sites of the 17th, 18th and 19th centuries.

The current castle, of Roman origin, is a modification of the Muslim alcázar begun in 1281, it lasted until 1343, during the reigns of James II of Majorca , son of James I of Aragon, Sancho of Majorca and James III of Majorca. La Almudaina was the seat of the prosperous Majorcan kingdom of 14th century, during the reigns of the aforementioned monarch and his successors Sancho of Majorca and James III of Majorca, until passing to the Crown of Aragon with Peter IV in 1349.

During the first half of 16th century the upper floor was built by order of the King Charles V, Holy Roman Emperor.

In the same way as in the Royal Palace of Madrid, the Royal Palace of La Almudaina, is the official summer residence of the King, as well as other members of the Spanish royal family, who also reside in the Palace of Marivent and in the Palacio de la Zarzuela in Madrid.

External links

 Patrimonio Nacional | Royal Palace of La Almudaina
 Almudaina Palace, NorthSouthGuides Royal Almudaina Palace, Mallorca

Buildings and structures in Palma de Mallorca
Palaces in Spain
Royal residences in Spain
Museums in the Balearic Islands
Historic house museums in Spain
Tourist attractions in Mallorca
Alcazars and Alcazabas in Spain
Kingdom of Majorca
Crown of Aragon
Castles in the Balearic Islands
Government buildings completed in the 14th century
Buildings and structures completed in 1343
Gothic architecture in the Balearic Islands
Gothic palaces
Bien de Interés Cultural landmarks in the Balearic Islands